Ndele, Ndélé or N'Délé may refer to:

Places 
 N'Délé, Central African Republic
 Ndélé (Centre), Centre Region (Cameroon)
 Ndélé (South), South Region (Cameroon)

People 
 Albert Ndele (born 1930), Congolese politician
 José Ndele (1940–2000), Prime Minister of Democratic People's Republic of Angola